Chachchon Ratanarak is one of Thailand’s most distinguished business figures and the third generation of the Ratanarak family. 

The Ratanaraks are one of the few remaining 'old money' families in Thailand and have substantial holdings in a number of Thai-based companies including Bank of Ayudhya, Siam City Cement, Allianz Ayudhya Capital, Matching Maximize Studio, Medial Studio, Grand Canal Land and Eastern Star Real Estate as well as holding a majority stake in Bangkok Broadcasting & Television Company (BBTV), which operates Thailand's Channel 7.

Early life
Born in 1972, Chachchon is the only child of Krit Ratanarak, chairman of BBTV and head of the Ratanarak Group, and Associate Professor Chaiskran Hiranpruk, PhD. He is the grandson of Chuan Ratanarak, who founded Bank of Ayudhya (known today as Krungsri Bank), Siam City Cement (producer of the Insee Cement brand) and BBTV and was one of Thailand’s last great self-made business Titans.

Chachchon, also known as Ton or Tone, was educated in Thailand until he was 10. He continued his primary and secondary education in England, earning a degree in Economics from University of London in 1996.

Professional life
Described by a senior Goldman Sachs veteran as 'a natural entrepreneur', after leaving university, Chachchon declined an offer to join Goldman Sachs and instead chose to work for the family. According to a Thai biographer: “It is no exaggeration to conclude that today the Ratanarak's empire remains a giant with a bright future, with Chachchon Ratanarak the third generation leader in line to continue and to extend this solid family business’s tradition of prosperity.” In the early years of the Bangkok Business Challenge (Southeast Asia's first international business competition founded in 2002 by Sasin School of Management with awards bestowed by His Majesty the late King Bhumibol Adulyadej (King Rama IX)), top business leaders, entrepreneurs and investors were invited as judges, and Chachchon was the youngest on the committee.

The Ratanaraks are known to be very private; Forbes call them “a very secretive clan”, and Chachchon has been described as “influential while staying below the radar”. Despite their ownership in a variety of publicly listed companies, the Ratanaraks value privacy over publicity and rarely make an appearance. Even in the digital age when information is widely available, an Internet search on Chachchon would reveal very little information, all of which is in a professional capacity. He never appears in the society section of any media.

Chachchon has been a director of Siam City Cement from 2006 to 2019, during which the company shifted from being a leading domestic player to a regional player by expanding into fast-growing markets of Bangladesh, Cambodia, Sri Lanka and Vietnam.

Growing the family's existing businesses, Chachchon founded an asset management company Primavest in 2001 which at its height in 2007 had US$900 million in assets under management. Primavest was sold to Ayudhya Fund Management (now Krungsri Asset Management) of Bank of Ayudhya in 2009. He founded Tonson Group in 2006 and Tonson Property in 2007 to conduct investment and property development businesses in Thailand and overseas.

According to Forbes, the Ratanarak family’s holdings in the group businesses in 2014 were estimated to be worth US$5.1 billion, based on publicly known assets and excludes private assets and property. In 2012, the Thai publication ‘Which Family is Richest’ reported the Ratanarak family as having holdings in excess of US$10 billion since 1998 when other assets are included.

References

Chachchon Ratanarak
Chachchon Ratanarak
Living people
Year of birth missing (living people)
Chachchon Ratanarak